National Magazine Company (or Nat Mags) is a British magazine publisher based in London. It was established in 1910 by William Randolph Hearst and was a wholly owned subsidiary of the Hearst Corporation.

Arnaud de Puyfontaine became chief executive of Nat Mags in 2009. His predecessor Duncan Edwards had been at the company since around 1990 and was previously managing director. In 2008 The Guardian newspaper named Duncan Edwards the 75th most important person in the British media.

In 2006 Nat Mags expanded into digital media by purchasing women's portal website Handbag.com. Nat Mags soon launched its digital arm Hearst Digital to act as an umbrella for Handbag and its other web acquisition, Net Doctor.

Nat Mags merged with Hachette Filipacchi Médias UK in 2011 to form Hearst Magazines UK.

Publications
Nat Mags publishes the below magazines in the United Kingdom:

Best
Cosmopolitan
Country Living
Delish
Digital Spy
Elle (licensed)
Elle Decoration (licensed)
Esquire
Good Housekeeping
Harper's Bazaar
House Beautiful
Inside Soap
Men’s Health
Net Doctor
Prima
Real People
Red
Runner's World 
Town & Country
Women's Health

Previous publications
Nat Mags previously published the below magazines in the United Kingdom:

 All About Soap
 Antique Collector (sold)
 Coast (sold)
 Company
 Connoisseur
 Cosmopolitan Bride
 Nash's
 Prima Baby (sold)
 QP
 Reveal
 SHE
 SHE's Having a Baby
 Triathlete's World
 Vanity Fair (sold)
 Womancraft
 You & Your Wedding (sold)
 Zest magazine

References

External links

Magazine publishing companies of the United Kingdom
1910 establishments in England
Publishing companies established in 1910
2011 disestablishments in England
Publishing companies disestablished in 2011
Mass media companies based in London